There are 4 dong in Dobong-gu.

 Banghak-dong (방학동 放鶴洞) 1, 2, 3
 Chang-dong (창동 倉洞) 1, 2, 3, 4, 5
 Dobong-dong (도봉동 道峰洞) 1, 2
 Ssangmun-dong (쌍문동 雙門洞) 1, 2, 3, 4

List by population and area

General information